Umm Kulthūm bint Muḥammad (–630) was the third daughter of the Islamic prophet Muhammad by his first wife Khadija bint Khuwaylid.

Conversion to Islam
She was born in Mecca, probably the fifth of their six children. She was legally married before August 610 to Utaybah ibn Abi Lahab, but the marriage was never consummated. She was still living with her parents when Muhammad first declared himself a prophet, and Umm Kulthum became a Muslim soon after her mother did.

After Muhammad warned Abu Lahab of hellfire in 613, Abu Lahab told Utaybah that he would never speak to him again unless he divorced Umm Kulthum, so he did. Her maternal brother, Hind ibn Abi Hala, asked Muhammad, "Why did you separate Umm Kulthum from Utaybah?" Muhammad replied, "Allah did not allow me to marry her to a person who is not going to Paradise."

Muhammad left Mecca in September 622. Before long Zayd ibn Haritha brought instructions to Umm Kulthum and her sister Fatima to join their father in Medina. Their uncle Al-Abbas put them on a camel; but as they were setting off, Huwayrith ibn Nuqaydh goaded the animal so that it threw them to the ground. However, Umm Kulthum and Fatima arrived safely in Medina. Muhammad remembered the assault and, when he conquered Mecca in 630, he sentenced Huwayrith to death.

Second marriage
After the death of her sister Ruqayya left Uthman a widower, he married Umm Kulthum. The marriage was legally contracted in August/September 624, but they did not live together until December. The marriage was childless.

Soon after the Battle of Uhud, Umm Kulthum answered the door to a man who said he owed money to Uthman. Umm Kulthum sent for her husband and learned that the visitor was a cousin from the enemy army who was seeking protection. Uthman was displeased but he went to ask Muhammad about it. While he was out, some Muslims entered the house and asked Umm Kulthum where the fugitive was. She pointed to his hiding-place behind a water-skin, and they pulled him out. They brought him before Muhammad just as Uthman was pleading for the safe-conduct. Muhammad granted Uthman the right of protection for three days, so Uthman quickly gave his cousin a camel to assist his escape. But after three days, the Muslims overtook him on the road and killed him anyway.

Death	 	
Umm Kulthum died in November/December 630. Her father tearfully conducted her funeral prayers; then Ali, Usama ibn Zayd and Abu Talha laid the corpse. Muhammad said, "If I had ten daughters, I would marry them all to Uthman." Uthman was known as Dhu al-Nurayn ("the possessor of the two lights") because it was believed that no other man had ever been married to two daughters of a prophet.

Twelver Shia View 
Recent Shia accounts don't consider her to have been a biological daughter of Muhammad; they regard Fatimah as his only biological daughter. According to most Shia and Sunnis, the narrations stipulating this are not authentic.

See also
 Muhammad's children
 Fatimah
 Companions of the Prophet
 Zainab bint Muhammad

References

603 births
630 deaths
7th-century women
Women companions of the Prophet
Children of Muhammad
Burials at Jannat al-Baqī